Sowmaeh (also Romanized as Şowma‘eh) is a village in Dizajrud-e Sharqi Rural District, Qaleh Chay District, Ajab Shir County, East Azerbaijan Province, Iran. At the 2006 census, its population was 374, in 71 families.

References 

Populated places in Ajab Shir County